Deloria is a Native American surname, derived from the name of a French trapper, Phillippe des Lauriers, who settled and married into a Yankton community of the Dakota people, and may refer to:

 Ella Cara Deloria (1888-1971), educator, anthropologist, ethnographer, linguist, and author of Waterlily.
 Phillip S. 'Sam' Deloria (Standing Rock Sioux Tribe), former director of the American Indian Law Center and the American Indian Graduate Center, Albuquerque, New Mexico
 Philip Joseph Deloria, an Episcopal priest, aka Tipi Sapa (Black Lodge), a leader of the Yankton/Nakota band of the Sioux Nation
 Vine Deloria Jr. (1933-2005), American Indian author, theologian, historian, and activist
 Philip J. Deloria (born 1959), American Indian author, historian, and son of Vine Deloria Jr.

References

Native American surnames
Dakota culture